Pro Tools is a digital multitrack audio software program.

Pro Tools may also refer to:
 Pro Tools (album), an album by GZA
 Pro Tools, an art exhibit by Cory Arcangel